"Fiumi di parole" (literally "Rivers of words") is a song recorded by the Italian duo Jalisse. The song was written by Fabio Ricci, Carmen Di Domenico and Alessandra Drusian. It is best known as the  entry at the Eurovision Song Contest 1997, held in Dublin, after winning the Sanremo Music Festival 1997.

Background
The song is a dramatic ballad, in which the lead singer tells her lover that "rivers of words" have come between them. She claims not to understand what he is saying anymore, and believes that she is losing his respect. Despite this, she tells him "I'll give you my heart, if you want / if you can, speak to it now", implying that there is still some hope for the relationship.

Jalisse also recorded a Spanish-language version of the song entitled "Ríos de palabras".

Eurovision
The song was performed ninth on the night of the 1997 Eurovision Song Contest, held on 3 May 1997, following the ' Mrs. Einstein with "Niemand heeft nog tijd" and preceding 's Marcos Llunas with "Sin rencor". At the close of voting, it had received 114 points, placing 4th in a field of 25.

Following the contest, Italian broadcaster Radiotelevisione Italiana (RAI) withdrew from the contest and did not return until . Thus, the song was succeeded as Italian representative by Raphael Gualazzi with "Madness of love".

Track listing

References

Eurovision songs of Italy
Eurovision songs of 1997
1997 songs
Sanremo Music Festival songs